Notiopostega is a genus of moths of the Opostegidae family. It contains only one species Notiopostega atrata which is known only from the coastal hills of the Valdivia Province in Chile.

The length of the forewings is 5–6 mm for males and 6.4-8.3 mm for females. Adults are on wing from late August to early October in one generation. They fly during the day in the early spring. Their nearly black coloration is undoubtedly an adaptation toward this habit.

The larvae feed on Nothofagus dombeyi. They bore into the leaf and from there through the petiole into the supporting branch, eventually reaching the main trunk. There it continues to mine the cambium layer, creating a sinuate "zig-zag" trail down the trunk. The mines are the longest of any known bark or stem miner, ranging to seven meters with a maximum width of 2.4 mm. At times they may extend all the way down the trunk to the roots.

Etymology
The generic name is derived from the Greek  (southern) prefixed to the generic stem Opostega, in reference to the extreme austral distribution of this taxon. It is feminine in gender. The specific name is derived from the Latin atratus (dressed in black), in reference to the characteristic dark vestiture of this species.

External links
Generic Revision of the Opostegidae, with a Synoptic Catalog of the World's Species (Lepidoptera: Nepticuloidea)

Opostegidae
Monotrysia genera
Monotypic moth genera
Moths of South America
Endemic fauna of Chile